Zayed Al-Hammadi (Arabic:زايد الحمادي) (born 23 February 1996) is an Emirati footballer. He currently plays as a goalkeeper for Al Bataeh on loan from Al Wahda.

Career

Al Dhafra
Al-Hammadi started his career at Al Dhafra and is a product of the Al Dhafra's youth system. On 14 January 2017, Al-Hammadi made his professional debut for Al Dhafra against Al-Nasr in the Pro League.

Hatta
On 30 June 2019 left Al Dhafra and signed with Hatta on loan of season. On 19 September 2019, Al-Hammadi made his professional debut for Hatta against Shabab Al-Ahli in the Pro League.

External links

References

1996 births
Living people
Emirati footballers
Al Dhafra FC players
Hatta Club players
Khor Fakkan Sports Club players
Al Wahda FC players
Al Bataeh Club players
UAE Pro League players
Association football goalkeepers
Place of birth missing (living people)